Nevskia soli is a Gram-negative, strictly aerobic, rod-shaped and motile  bacterium from the genus of Nevskia which has been isolated from soil from a ginseng field from the Jeju Island in Korea.

References

Bacteria described in 2008
Xanthomonadales